Bolshoye Shimonovo is a rural locality (a village) in Karinskoye Rural Settlement, Alexandrovsky District, Vladimir Oblast, Russia. The population was 29 as of 2010. There are 3 streets.

Geography 
Bolshoye Shimonovo is located 14 km southeast of Alexandrov (the district's administrative centre) by road. Maloye Shimonovo is the nearest rural locality.

References 

Rural localities in Alexandrovsky District, Vladimir Oblast
Alexandrovsky Uyezd (Vladimir Governorate)